Janet May Steinbeck (born 27 February 1951), also known by her married name Janet Murray, was an Australian competitive swimmer of the 1960s who raced internationally in the Olympics and Commonwealth Games, winning two silver medals as a member of Australian relay teams.  Steinbeck was primarily a freestyle swimmer.

As a 15-year-old at the 1966 British Empire and Commonwealth Games in Kingston, Jamaica, Steinbeck won a silver medal in the women's 4×110-yard freestyle relay.  Swimming the first leg of the four-swimmer relay, she combined with teammates Janice Murphy, Lynette Bell and Marion Smith for a time of 4:11.1, three tenths of a second behind the world-record-setting Canadians, and two tenths ahead of the third-place English team.  She also swam in the individual 220-yard backstroke, coming eighth in the event final.

At the 1968 Summer Olympics in Mexico City, Steinbeck won a silver medal as a member of the second-place Australian women's team in the 4×100-metre medley relay.  She combined with Lynne Watson, Lyn McClements and Judy Playfair to register a silver medal in the 4×100-metre medley relay, trailing the Americans home by 1.7 seconds.  However, it was in Steinbeck's freestyle anchor leg that American Susan Pedersen's used her 59.4-second individual split to solidify the Americans' 1.7-second margin of victory.  She was also part of the Australian team that came fourth in the women's 4×100-metre freestyle relay.  Individually, she competed in the semifinals of the 100-metre freestyle, and the preliminary heats of the 200-metre freestyle.

See also
 List of Olympic medalists in swimming (women)

Notes

References

Bibliography

External links
 
 

1951 births
Living people
Australian female freestyle swimmers
Australian people of German descent
Olympic swimmers of Australia
People from Queensland
Swimmers at the 1968 Summer Olympics
Medalists at the 1968 Summer Olympics
Olympic silver medalists for Australia
Olympic silver medalists in swimming
Commonwealth Games medallists in swimming
Commonwealth Games silver medallists for Australia
Swimmers at the 1966 British Empire and Commonwealth Games
Medallists at the 1966 British Empire and Commonwealth Games